Kadjebi-Asato is a town in the Oti Region of Ghana. The town is known for the Kadjebi-Asato Secondary School.  The school is a second cycle institution.

References

Populated places in the Oti Region